Anthony Robinson may refer to:

Anthony Charles Robinson (born 1952), British entrepreneur and micro-enterprise campaigner
Anthony John Robinson (1925–1982), British field hockey player
Anthony Robinson (novelist) (born 1931), American novelist and short story writer
Anthony Robinson (MP) (1592–?), English politician
Anthony Robinson (Unitarian) (1762–1827), English Unitarian minister
Tubby T, real name Anthony Robinson (1974–2008), British dancehall/garage musician
Anthony Robinson, swimmer from the United States, who briefly in 2001 held the World Record in the long course 50 breaststroke
Anthony Robinson, contestant from Survivor: Fiji (2007)

See also
Tony Robinson (disambiguation)
Antonee Robinson